Grimm Love (original German title Rohtenburg, a pun on roh "raw" + Rotenburg) is a 2006 psychological horror film inspired by the Armin Meiwes cannibal murder case.

Plot
Keri Russell plays Katie Armstrong, an American student in Germany studying criminal psychology. She chooses a notorious subject for her thesis: the cannibal killer Oliver Hartwin (played by Thomas Kretschmann). Oliver dreamed of eating a willing victim and, thanks to the internet, he was able to find a volunteer, a young man named Simon Grombeck (played by ).

The story is told in flashbacks as Katie researches these men and their pasts. Events culminate in Katie's discovery of a snuff tape that documents the crime.

Cast

Production
The film is directed by music-video specialist Martin Weisz and written by T. S. Faull.

Release
The film had its world premiere at London FrightFest Film Festival on 27 August 2006 under the title Grimm Love.

In October 2006, the film won four awards at the Festival de Cine de Sitges: Best Director, Best Actor (Thomas Kretschmann and Thomas Huber), and Best Cinematography. It won the Melies d'Argent at the Luxembourg International Film Festival. In July 2007, the film won Best Director and Best Actor (Thomas Kretschman and Thomas Huber) at the Puchon International Fantastic Film Festival.

Rohtenburg was scheduled for release in Germany on 9 March 2006. In March 2006, the film was banned by a German court for infringing the personal rights of Armin Meiwes, but the film has been sold for international release and will be shown worldwide. In May 2009, the Federal Court of Justice annulled the ban in favor of freedom of arts.

The film has also screened at Austin's South by Southwest festival, among others, in advance of its US release. It is part of the 2010 Fangoria FrightFest.

Notes

External links
 
 

2006 films
2006 crime drama films
English-language German films
German LGBT-related films
2000s crime thriller films
Crime films based on actual events
Films about snuff films
Films about cannibalism
2000s exploitation films
2006 LGBT-related films
2006 drama films
Films directed by Martin Weisz
Film censorship in Germany
Film controversies in Germany
Obscenity controversies in film
2000s English-language films
2000s German films